Mchenga thinos is a species of fish in the family Cichlidae. It is endemic to Lake Malawi, where it is distributed lake-wide. Its natural habitat is freshwater lakes.

References

thinos
Fish of Lake Malawi
Fish of Malawi
Fish of Mozambique
Freshwater fish of Tanzania
Fish described in 1993
Taxonomy articles created by Polbot